Aliağa railway station is a railway station in Aliağa, Turkey and is the northern terminus of the Northern Line of the İZBAN commuter rail system. The station was built in 1996 by the Turkish State Railways but remained without passenger train service until 30 January 2011, when the Northern Line was extended north from Çiğli.

History
Aliağa has a big port, mainly for oil and bulk. The city did not however have rail transport. In 1995, the Turkish State Railways started building a  double track line, branching from Menemen, to Aliağa. The line was opened in 1996. Even though the main purpose of the line was for freight trains, Aliağa station had a twice daily regional train to Basmane Station in İzmir. In 2002, the tracks were electrified with 25 kV AC overhead wire, but was never used. When the construction of the Karşıyaka Rail Tunnel started in 2006, passenger service ceased to Aliağa. The station reopened on January 30, 2011.

Bus Connections
ESHOT

740 Aliağa-Menemen

References

Railway stations in İzmir Province
Railway stations opened in 1996
1996 establishments in Turkey
Aliağa District